Panam y circo is a children's television series, aired by El Trece. It is hosted by Laura Franco, known as "Panam".

Argentine children's television series
El Trece original programming